The 2007 Women's World Open Squash Championship is the women's edition of the 2007 World Open, which serves as the individual world championship for squash players. The event was held outsite the Royal Palace of Madrid in Madrid, Spain from 23 to 27 October 2007. Rachael Grinham defeated sister Natalie in the final.

Ranking points
In 2007, the points breakdown were as follows:

Seeds

Draw and results

See also
World Open
2007 Men's World Open Squash Championship

References

External links
Squash player site

World Squash Championships
W
squ
2007 in Madrid
Squash tournaments in Spain
Sports competitions in Madrid
2007 in women's squash
International sports competitions hosted by Spain